Kahi is a village in the Nowshera district, in Khyber Pakhtunkhwa, Pakistan.

Economy
The village has a large cement plant. Education is provided via a local high school. All basic Health Services is available at Ahmed Brothers Medical Store and Health Care Center Near Madina Masjid Mohallah Amal Khel Kahi (https://goo.gl/maps/UC8BQjXzCHJqxoba8).

Politics 
Baseer Ahmad Khattak was a member of the Khyber Pakhtunkhwa Assembly and lives in the village.

References

Populated places in Nowshera District